Hammer of the Gods may refer to:

 Hammer of the Gods (book), a 1985 biography of the rock band Led Zeppelin
 Hammer of the Gods (video game), a 1994 strategy computer game
 Hammer of the Gods (album), by Bottomless Pit
 "Hammer of the Gods" (Supernatural), an episode of the television series Supernatural
 Hammer of the Gods (2009 film), a 2009 Syfy television film
 Hammer of the Gods (2013 film), a 2013 film

See also
 The Hammer of God (disambiguation)
 Mjölnir, Thor's hammer